T-Bird is a colloquial name for Ford Thunderbird automobiles.

T-Bird or T-Birds may also refer to:

 Lockheed T-33 Shooting Star, a subsonic American jet trainer
 Golden Circle Air T-Bird, a family of ultralight aircraft produced by Teratorn Aircraft
 Parker RP9 T-Bird, an American, high-wing, T-tailed, single-seat, FAI Open Class glider
 Thunderbird (T-Bird), the second generation of the AMD microprocessor Athlon
 "T-Birds", a song on the album Autoamerican by Blondie
 T-Bird, a character in the 1994 film The Crow
 "The T-Bird", a common name for the Lillooet Indian Reserve No. 1 of the T'it'q'et First Nation
 T-Bird or Thunderbird, team mascot of Ross Sheppard High School in Edmonton, Alberta, Canada
 T-Bird or Thunderbird, earlier team mascot of Shorewood High School in Shoreline, Washington, United States
 T-Birds, a greaser gang in the 1978 film Grease and its sequel
 The T-Birds, 1950's band including Sid Haig

See also
 T-Bird at Ako, a 1982 Filipino film
 T-Bird Gang, a 1959 American film
 T-Bird Rhythm, a 1982 studio album by The Fabulous Thunderbirds
 Golden T-Bird Awards, original name of the Asbury Park Music Awards
 Thunderbird (disambiguation)